Dino Gillarduzzi (born 15 October 1975) is an Italian speed skater. He competed in two events at the 2002 Winter Olympics.

References

External links
 

1975 births
Living people
Italian male speed skaters
Olympic speed skaters of Italy
Speed skaters at the 2002 Winter Olympics
People from Cortina d'Ampezzo
Sportspeople from the Province of Belluno